Mong Hsat (Burmese: မိုင်းဆတ်မြို့, MLCTS: muing.chat.mrui) is a town in the Shan State of Myanmar, the capital of Mong Hsat Township. It is served by Monghsat Airport.

History
Monghsat State (Mönghsat, where Mong is equivalent to Thai Mueang) was one of the Shan States. It was a tributary state of Kengtung State. The capital was the town of Monghsat.

In 1950s, Republic of China Armed Forces controlled the town, and tried to build the town as a base to counterattack against Mainland China which was taken over by the Chinese Communist Party to establish People's Republic of China before then.

Cultivation of the opium poppy is said to be on the rise in the area after the United Wa State Army decided to stop it in their territory of northern Shan state, in 2000s.

Climate

References

External links
Satellite map GeoNames

Populated places in Mongsat District
Township capitals of Myanmar